J30 may refer to:

Vehicles 
Automobiles
 Honda J30, an automobile engine
 Infiniti J30, a Japanese luxury car
 Nissan J30, a Japanese sedan
 Toyota Land Cruiser (J30), a Japanese off-road vehicle

Boats
 J/30, keelboat

Locomotives
 GSR Class J30, an Irish steam locomotive

Other uses 
 Pentagonal orthobicupola, a Johnson solid (J30)
 Rhinitis
 Westinghouse J30, a turbojet engine
 J30 index, a stock index tracking the Tokyo Stock Exchange